The following lists events that happened during 2011 in Kuwait.

Incumbents
Emir: Sabah Al-Ahmad Al-Jaber Al-Sabah 
Prime Minister: Nasser Al-Sabah (until 30 November), Jaber Al-Mubarak Al-Hamad Al-Sabah (starting 30 November)

Events

January
 January 5 - Prime Minister Nasser Mohammed Al-Ahmed Al-Sabah narrowly survives a no confidence vote, following a crackdown at an opposition demonstration in December.

February
 February 18 - A thousand or more non-citizen residents of Kuwait demonstrated demanding rights given to Kuwaiti citizens.

March
 March 11 - Riot police fire tear gas at a demonstration of stateless Arabs demanding more rights.
 March 30 - Kuwait recalls its ambassador to Iran after it convicted three people on charges of spying for Iran.

August
 August 26 - Al Arabiya television reports that three rockets have hit the border area between Kuwait and Iraq.

November
 November 28 - Prime Minister Sheikh Nasser Mohammed Al-Ahmed Al-Sabah and his cabinet resign after protesters storm the national Parliament.

References

 
Kuwait
Kuwait
Years of the 21st century in Kuwait
2010s in Kuwait